Franjo Neidhardt (14 January 1907 – 20 November 1984) was a Croatian architect. His work was part of the architecture event in the art competition at the 1948 Summer Olympics. He is the father of Velimir Neidhardt, also a prominent architect.

References

1907 births
1984 deaths
20th-century Croatian architects
Olympic competitors in art competitions
Architects from Zagreb